Attacus crameri is a moth in the family Saturniidae. It is found on Buru, Seram and Ambon Island. The specific name crameri  is a reference to Pieter Cramer, an 18th-century wool merchant and entomologist.

References

Saturniidae
Moths described in 1861
Moths of Indonesia